Karine Icher (born 26 January 1979) is a French professional golfer who plays mainly on the U.S.-based LPGA Tour and is also a member of the Ladies European Tour.

Amateur career
Icher was born in Châteauroux, Indre. She had a successful amateur career and was twice Junior Champion of France winning the Girls 15-16 age group in 1994 and the 17-18 age group in 1996. In 1997 she was a member of the victorious European team in the Vagliano Trophy and won the Spanish International Ladies Amateur Championship whilst in 1998 she won the French Amateur Cup. In 1999 she was in the European Team which retained the Vagliano Trophy, was part of the victorious French team at the European Team Championship, defended the French Amateur Cup and won the International Amateur Open of Germany.

In 2000, she won the International Amateur Open of France and was a member of the winning French team at the 2000 Espirito Santo Trophy Women's World
Amateur Team Championship finishing fourth in the individual competition. She turned professional on 1 September 2000 and finished first at the Ladies European Tour Qualifying School to earn exempt status for the 2001 season.

Professional career
In her 2001 LET rookie season Icher won two tournaments, the Palmerston Ladies German Open and the Mexx Sport Open in the Netherlands. She finished the year third on the Order of Merit and second behind Suzann Pettersen for the LET Rookie of the Year title. In 2002, she won the Caja Duero Open de Espana, tied for seventh at the Evian Masters and was qualified in third place for the European 2002 Solheim Cup team. She earned non-exempt status for the 2003 LPGA season having tied for 38th at the 2002 LPGA Final Qualifying Tournament but chose to continue full-time on the Ladies European Tour. She retained her non-exempt status at the 2003 LPGA Final Qualifying Tournament by finishing tied sixty-fifth.

Icher played full-time on the Ladies European Tour in 2004, ending with five top ten finishes including a win at the Catalonia Ladies Masters. She retained her non-exempt status at the 2004 LPGA Final Qualifying Tournament by finishing tied fifty-fifth and elected to play her rookie season on the LPGA beginning the year with conditional playing privileges. A second-place finish at the Corona Morelia Championship in Mexico meant that after the re-rank she earned her full LPGA card for 2005. She finished 30th on the money list in her rookie season. She returned to the Ladies European Tour to play in the Catalonia Ladies Masters which she successfully defended. She started the 2006 season by pairing with Gwladys Nocera to represent France at the Women's World Cup of Golf.

Personal life
Icher gave birth to a daughter in July 2011 and did not play in LET events or in LPGA majors after April 2011, including in the Solheim Cup in September 2011.

Professional wins (5)

Ladies European Tour (5)
2001 Palmerston Ladies German Open, Mexx Sport Open
2002 Caja Duero Open de Espana
2004 Catalonia Ladies Masters
2005 Catalonia Ladies Masters

Results in LPGA majors
Results not in chronological order before 2019.

^ The Evian Championship was added as a major in 2013

CUT = missed the half-way cut
"T" tied

Summary

Most consecutive cuts made – 6 (2010 British Open – 2013 Kraft Nabisco)
Longest streak of top-10s – 1 (three times)

Team appearances
Amateur
European Lady Junior's Team Championship (representing France): 1996
European Ladies' Team Championship (representing France): 1997, 1999 (winners)
Espirito Santo Trophy (representing France): 1998, 2000 (winners)

Professional
Solheim Cup (representing Europe): 2002, 2013 (winners), 2015, 2017
World Cup (representing France): 2006
The Queens (representing Europe): 2015

Solheim Cup record

Notes and references

External links

French female golfers
Ladies European Tour golfers
LPGA Tour golfers
Solheim Cup competitors for Europe
Olympic golfers of France
Golfers at the 2016 Summer Olympics
Sportspeople from Indre
People from Châteauroux
1979 births
Living people